Isabelle Harrison (born September 27, 1993)  is an American basketball player for the Chicago Sky of the Women's National Basketball Association (WNBA). She is the daughter of former NFL Defensive End Dennis Harrison Jr.

College career
Harrison tore her ACL in February 2015 against Kentucky.
She was the 34th Lady Vol to be drafted in the WNBA Draft, the first since the 2012 WNBA Draft when Glory Johnson and Kelley Cain were drafted.

Tennessee statistics
Source

Professional career
Harrison was drafted 12th overall by the Phoenix Mercury in the 2015 WNBA Draft. She sat out the 2015 season due to a torn ACL while playing in her senior year at Tennessee. She would make her debut in 2016. In her rookie season, she averaged 3.1 ppg and 1.8 rpg in 26 games as a reserve for the Mercury. In 2017, Harrison was traded to the San Antonio Stars along with a first round draft pick in exchange for Danielle Robinson. On May 16, 2019, Harrison was traded to the Dallas Wings.

WNBA career statistics

Regular season 

|-
| style="text-align:left;"| 2016
| style="text-align:left;"| Phoenix
| 26 || 1 || 7.5 || .525 || .000 || .680 || 1.8 || 0.0 || 0.4 || 0.1 || 0.7 || 3.1
|-
| style="text-align:left;"| 2017
| style="text-align:left;"| San Antonio
| 34 || 33 || 26.6 || .500 || .500 || .635 || 6.4 || 1.4 || 0.8 || 0.7 || 2.0 || 11.4
|-
| style="text-align:left;"| 2019
| style="text-align:left;"| Dallas
| 31 || 29 || 25.6 || .456 || .000 || .716 || 5.8 || 1.4 || 1.1 || 0.8 || 1.5 || 8.6
|-
| style="text-align:left;"| 2020
| style="text-align:left;"| Dallas
| 13 || 11 || 19.8 || .447 || .000 || .789 || 4.6 || 1.5 || 0.7 || 0.4 || 1.4 || 6.4
|-
| style="text-align:left;"| 2021
| style="text-align:left;"| Dallas
| 28 || 5 || 23.8 || .538 || .000 || .783 || 5.9 || 1.1 || 1.1 || 0.7 || 1.5 || 10.9
|-
| style="text-align:left;"| 2022
| style="text-align:left;"| Dallas
| 35 || 18 || 18.4 || .466 || 1.000 || .867 || 4.3 || 1.3 || 0.7 || 0.1 || 1.3 || 8.7
|-
| style="text-align:left;"| Career
| style="text-align:left;"| 6 years, 3 teams
| 167 || 97 || 20.7 || .490 || .214 || .743 || 4.9 || 1.1 || 0.8 || 0.5 || 1.4 || 8.6

Postseason 

|-
| style="text-align:left;"| 2016
| style="text-align:left;"| Phoenix
| 3 || 0 || 13.7 || .615 || .000 || .000 || 6.0 || 0.0 || 0.0 || 0.0 || 0.7 || 5.3
|-
| style="text-align:left;"| 2021
| style="text-align:left;"| Dallas
| 1 || 0 || 29.0 || .308 || .000 || .500 || 10.0 || 1.0 || 0.0 || 0.0 || 1.0 || 9.0
|-
| style="text-align:left;"| 2022
| style="text-align:left;"| Dallas
| 3 || 2 || 12.3 || .538 || .000 || 1.000 || 1.7 || 0.3 || 0.0 || 0.3 || 5.3
|-
| style="text-align:left;"| Career
| style="text-align:left;"| 3 years, 2 teams
| 7 || 2 || 15.3 || .487 || .000 || .500 || 4.7 || 0.3 || 0.1 || 0.0 || 0.6 || 5.9

References

External links
Tennessee Volunteers bio
WNBA bio

1993 births
Living people
American women's basketball players
Basketball players from Nashville, Tennessee
Dallas Wings players
Phoenix Mercury draft picks
Phoenix Mercury players
Power forwards (basketball)
San Antonio Stars players
Tennessee Lady Volunteers basketball players